Tantric Harmonies is Russian independent music label started in early 2000. This label releases mostly tribal, ritualistic and ethnic based post-industrial music. The label is on stand-by since early 2008.

Artists 
 Bad Sector
 Beequeen
 Cataclyst
 Angie Damage
 Gianfranco Grilli
 Hybryds
 Jarl
 Maeror Tri
 Daniel Menche
 Merzbow
 Muslimgauze
 Necrophorus
 Omenya
 Ontayso
 Rapoon
 Sala
 Staruha Mha
 Antonio Testa
 This Morn' Omina

External links
 - Tantric Harmonies at Discogs

Russian record labels
Ambient music record labels
Industrial record labels
Noise music record labels